The 514th Fighter-Interceptor Squadron is an inactive United States Air Force unit.  Its last assignment was with the 86th Air Division, based at Ramstein Air Base, Germany, where it was inactivated on 8 January 1961.

The squadron was first activated as the 630th Bombardment Squadron in 1943.  While retaining its mission as a ground attack unit, it became the 514th Fighter-Bomber Squadron a few months after activating.  After training in the United States, it moved to the European Theater of Operations in the spring of 1944.  It entered combat soon thereafter, and following D-Day, moved to the European continent, where it gave close air support to American ground forces advancing across Europe.  It earned two Distinguished Unit Citations for its actions during the war.  Following V-E Day, the squadron served in the Army of Occupation until 1946, when it was inactivated and its personnel and equipment transferred to another unit.

The squadron was reactivated in 1952, when it replaced an Air National Guard unit that had been mobilized for the Korean War.  The following year it assumed an air defense mission and continued with that mission until inactivated.

History
The squadron was first activated as the 630th Bombardment Squadron at Key Field, Mississippi on 1 March 1943.  It was one of the four original squadrons of the 406th Bombardment Group and was initially equipped with a variety of attack, pursuit, and trainer aircraft.  Although its mission did not substantially change, the squadron became the 514th Fighter-Bomber Squadron in August.  It moved to Congaree Army Air Field, South Carolina and equipped with Republic P-47 Thunderbolts before the end of the year.  The 514th trained with its "Jugs" until March 1944, when it departed the United States for the European Theater of Operations.

The squadron arrived at RAF Ashford in England in early April and flew its first combat mission the following month, preparing for Operation Overlord, the Allied invasion of Normandy.  It attacked military airfields, bridges and marshalling yards in France.  On D-Day, the squadron flew patrols in the vicinity of the invasion beaches and armed reconnaissance and dive bombing missions.

The squadron supported Operation Cobra, the Allied breakthrough at Saint-Lo on 25 July, then moved to Tour-en-Bessin Airfield in France a few days later. The 514th participated in the reduction of Saint-Malo and Brest, France and supported the drive across France.  On 7 September, flying from Saint-Léonard Airfield, the squadron operated with the other units of the 406th Fighter Group in destroying a column of tanks, armored vehicles and motor transport that were trying to escape to southeastern France through the Belfort Gap.  This attack earned the squadron the Distinguished Unit Citation (DUC).  The squadron cooperated with ground forces and flew air interdiction sorties in the area of the Mosel and Saar Rivers.

When the Germans launched the counterattack that resulted in the Battle of the Bulge in December 1944, the squadron shifted operations to the Ardennes to relive the embattled garrison at Bastogne.  For four days in late December, the squadron flew attacks on German vehicles, gun emplacements and defensive positions close to Bastogne, for which it was awarded a second DUC.   The squadron flew escort, interdiction, and air support missions in the Ruhr Valley early in 1945 and to assist Allied ground forces in the drive to and across the Rhine.

Following, V-E Day, the squadron moved to AAF Station Nordholz, Germany, where it became part of the Army of Occupation.  The squadron was inactivated on 20 August 1946, and its personnel and equipment were transferred to the 527th Fighter Squadron. which was activated the same day.

Air defense in Europe

The squadron returned to its Fighter-Bomber designation and was activated in July 1952 at RAF Manston, England, where it replaced the 167th Fighter-Bomber Squadron, a West Virginia Air National Guard unit that had been mobilized for the Korean War.  The 514th assumed the mission, personnel and Republic F-84 Thunderjets of the 167th, which was returned to state control.  In late 1953, the squadron converted to North American F-86D Sabres. In 1954, the squadron was designated the 514th Fighter-Interceptor Squadron.

When the 406th Fighter-Interceptor Wing reorganized in May 1956, the 406th Fighter-Interceptor Group was inactivated and the squadron assigned directly to wing headquarters. In February 1958, the 406th Wing began phasing down its operations as it prepared for inactivation. In connection with this drawdown, the squadron moved to Ramstein-Landstuhl Air Base when the 406th inactivated on 15 May 1958 and was reassigned to the 86th Fighter-Interceptor Wing.  The squadron was inactivated on 8 January 1961, one of the last two F-86D squadrons in United States Air Forces in Europe.

Lineage
 Constituted as the 630th Bombardment Squadron (Dive) on 4 February 1943
 Activated on 1 March 1943
 Redesignated 514th Fighter-Bomber Squadron on 10 August 1943
 Redesignated 514th Fighter Squadron on 30 May 1944
 Inactivated on 20 August 1946
 Redesignated 514th Fighter-Bomber Squadron on 25 June 1952
 Activated on 10 July 1952
 Redesignated 514th Fighter-Interceptor Squadron on 1 April 1954
 Discontinued and inactivated on 8 January 1961

Assignments
 406th Bombardment Group (later 406th Fighter-Bomber Group, 406th Fighter Group), 1 March 1943 – 20 August 1946
 406th Fighter-Bomber Group (later 406th Fighter-Interceptor Group), 10 July 1952
 406th Fighter-Interceptor Wing, 1 May 1956
 86th Fighter-Interceptor Wing (later 86th Air Division), 25 April 1958 – 8 January 1961

Stations
 Key Field, Mississippi, 1 March 1943
 Congaree Army Air Field, South Carolina, 18 September 1943 – 13 March 1944
 RAF Ashford (AAF-417), England, 5 April 1944
 Tour-en-Bessin Airfield (A-13), France, c. 19 July 1944
 Cretteville Airfield (A-14), France, 17 August 1944
 Saint-Léonard Airfield (A-36), France, 4 September 1944
 Mourmelon-le-Grand Airfield (A-80), France, 24 September 1944
 Metz Airfield (Y-34), France, c. 31 January 1945
 Asch Airfield (Y-29), Belgium, c. 6 February 1945
 Münster-Handorf Airfield (Y-94), Germany, c. 15 April 1945
 AAF Station Nordholz (R-56), Germany, 5 June 1945 – 20 August 1946
 RAF Manston, England, 10 July 1952
 Ramstein-Landstuhl Air Base (later Ramstein Air Base), Germany, 15 May 1958 – 8 January 1961

Aircraft

 Douglas A-20 Havoc, 1943
 Douglas A-24 Banshee, 1943
 Curtiss A-25 Shrike, 1943
 Douglas A-26 Invader, 1943
 Vultee A-35 Vengeance, 1943
 North American A-36 Apache, 1943
 Cessna UC-78 Bobcat, 1943
 North American BC-1, 1943
 Bell P-39 Airacobra, 1943
 Curtiss P-40 Warhawk, 1943
 Republic P-47 Thunderbolt, 1943–1946
 Republic F-84 Thunderjet, 1952–1953
 North American F-86D Sabre, 1953–1961

Awards and campaigns

See also

 List of Douglas A-26 Invader operators
 List of F-86 Sabre units

References

Notes
 Explanatory notes

 Citations

Bibliography

 
 
 
 
 
 
 
 

Fighter squadrons of the United States Air Force
Military units and formations of the United States in the Cold War